Schacht was an American marque of automobiles and High-wheelers from 1904 to 1913, in Cincinnati, Ohio. The Schacht Manufacturing Company, later renamed Schacht Motor Car Company produced over 9,000 automobiles. The company was reorganized as the G.A. Schacht Motor Truck Company in 1914 and production of trucks and fire trucks continued until 1938.

History 
The Schacht Manufacturing Company was started by William and Gustav Schacht in Cincinnati, Ohio, producing buggies.  A sideline business of manufacturing automobile components grew into producing their first high-wheeler automobile in 1904. The Schacht was a twin-cylinder 10hp runabout, designed for rural roads with carriage wheels.

Advertised as "the simplest, most practical, efficient and economical car made", it had a steering wheel and attractive brass radiator from the beginning. The High-wheeler's were priced in the $650 range and were extremely popular.  In 1905 a larger 4-cylinder, 40hp touring car was added and marketed until 1907.  The touring car was luxury priced at $2,800 to $3,200, .  From 1908 to 1911 only high-wheel cars were produced.

The high-wheelers steadily grew more powerful resulting in the twin-cylinder engine rated at 24hp by 1910.  In 1911 Schacht returned to producing conventional touring cars with the 4-cylinder Model AA mid-priced at $1,385, .  Schacht marketed a "Three Purpose Car" which was a runabout that was convertible to a family car or delivery wagon.

Schacht entered the 1912 Indianapolis 500, with a Wisconsin engine race car, driven by Bill Endicott.  Endicott in the Schacht #18 placed Fifth.  Schacht ran the 1913 Indianapolis 500 with Johnny Jenkins driving Schacht #18 with a Schacht engine. Jenkins retired with a crankcase failure.

Gustav and William Schacht reported a "lack of good business system in all departments" and reorganized as the G. A. Schacht Motor Truck Company in 1914.  Schacht purchased or merged several times with other truck companies and continued building trucks and fire trucks until 1938.

Gallery

References

External links
The Schacht Mfg. Co
Schacht High-wheelers at ConceptCarz
Schacht Cars and Trucks made in Cincinnati, Ohio

Defunct motor vehicle manufacturers of the United States
Motor vehicle manufacturers based in Ohio
Defunct truck manufacturers
Emergency services equipment makers
Defunct companies based in Cincinnati
Vehicle manufacturing companies established in 1904
Vehicle manufacturing companies disestablished in 1940
1904 establishments in Ohio
1940 disestablishments in Ohio
Brass Era vehicles
1900s cars
1910s cars
Highwheeler
Cars introduced in 1904